Potamonautes platynotus is a species of freshwater crab which is endemic to Lake Tanganyika, where it is the only freshwater crab outside the genus Platythelphusa. Although primarily aquatic, P. platynotus is sometimes seen out of water, and can survive for many hours without water.

References

Potamoidea
Freshwater crustaceans of Africa
Crustaceans described in 1907
Taxonomy articles created by Polbot
Fauna of Lake Tanganyika